The United Left Front was an electoral alliance in West Bengal, India, formed in December 1966, ahead of the 1967 West Bengal Legislative Assembly election. The front comprised the Communist Party of India (Marxist), the Samyukta Socialist Party, the Socialist Unity Centre of India, the Marxist Forward Bloc, the Revolutionary Communist Party of India, the Workers Party of India and the Revolutionary Socialist Party. The front won 63 seats out of 280. After the election ULF merged with the People's United Left Front, forming the United Front. The UF formed a state government, dislodging the Indian National Congress for the first time in the state.

Election result of the ULF

References

1966 establishments in West Bengal
Defunct political parties in West Bengal
Defunct political party alliances in India
Political parties established in 1966
Political parties with year of disestablishment missing